Scarlet Blade may refer to:

 The Scarlet Blade (also The Crimson Blade), a British film
 Scarlet Blade (video game), a European/American localization title for Queen's Blade, a Korean MMORPG
 Scarlet Blade Theatre, a British theatre